Malawispongiidae is a family of freshwater sponges found in the ancient lakes of Malawi, Tanganyika, Kinneret, Ohrid and Poso. As presently defined, the family is polyphyletic.

Genera and species
The family contains five genera and six species:
 Cortispongilla (Lake Kinneret, but validity of this genus is questionable)
 Cortispongilla barroisi (Topsent, 1892)
 Malawispongia (Lake Malawi)
 Malawispongia echinoides Brien, 1972
 Ochridaspongia (Lake Ohrid)
 Ochridaspongia interlithonis Arndt, 1937
 Ochridaspongia rotunda Arndt, 1937
 Pachydictyum (Lake Poso)
 Pachydictyum globosum Weltner, 1901
 Spinospongilla (Lake Tanganyika)
 Spinospongilla polli Brien, 1974

References

Sponge families
Heteroscleromorpha